John Agboola Ojomo Agunloye II was the paramount Yoruba king of Ijebu, Owo in Ondo State, southwestern Nigeria. He died on 31 May 2003 and was succeeded by King  Kofoworola Oladoyinbo Ojomo, who ascended the throne on 13 June 2004.

References

Yoruba monarchs
Nigerian traditional rulers
People from Owo
2003 deaths